Yaacov Visoker (born 5 September 1930) is an Israeli footballer. He played in nine matches for the Israel national football team from 1956 to 1961.

References

External links
 

1930 births
Living people
Israeli footballers
Israel international footballers
Place of birth missing (living people)
Association footballers not categorized by position